WCHK (1290 kHz) is a commercial AM radio station broadcasting a Spanish-language Latin pop radio format, known as "La Mega."  Licensed to Canton, Georgia, it serves Metro Atlanta.  The call sign stands for Cherokee, the county of which Canton is the seat of government, largest city, and geographic center.  The station is currently owned by Davis Broadcasting of Atlanta, L.L.C.

By day, WCHK is powered at 10,000 watts, using a non-directional antenna.  But at night, to protect other stations on 1290 AM, it switches to a directional antenna and greatly reduces power to 500 watts.  The transmitter is on Keith Drive, near Interstate 575 and Hickory Log Creek in Canton.  WCHK is also heard on two FM translator stations:  96.5 W243CE in Winder and 105.1 W286DU in Canton.

History

The Glory Days of WCHK
WCHK first went on the air on April 11, 1957, under the ownership of Cherokee Broadcasting (headed by Chuck McClure, owner of Columbus-based McClure Broadcasting). Its programming involved country and southern gospel music, with local production. Among the personalities were station manager Byron Dobbs (retired in 1997), Mike McDougal, and Jim Axel (who moved to WAGA-TV).

WCHK-FM
Because WCHK was on the AM band with a daytime-only operation, it was required to sign-off by sunset, allowing clear-channel stations to take over the airwaves. Therefore, on August 1, 1964. WCHK launched a simulcast on 105.5 MHz, as WCHK-FM. This allowed the station to extend programming on the FM band by midnight.

In 1991, WCHK-FM received FCC approval to upgrade to a class C2 license. It relocated its transmitter to Bear Mountain, providing greater coverage in north Atlanta. At the same time, the station switched its frequency to 105.7 MHz. Another station from Carrollton, WMAX-FM, later occupied the 105.5 MHz frequency in 1994. (In 2002, WMAX moved to 105.3 MHz; it is now WRDG.)

The station was renamed "North Metro's K-105", then "Country 105.7", and finally as "Atlanta's Classic Country 105.7". WCHK-FM was bought by Clear Channel Communications (now iHeartMedia) in 1993, under a local marketing agreement, simulcasting news/talk station WGST as WGST-FM. (The station is now WBZY.)

In 1998, WCHK launched another simulcast on 100.1 MHz, licensed to Talking Rock, Georgia, under the WCHK-FM callsign. In 1999, WCHK-FM was renamed WNSY, launching an oldies format as Sunny 100. The new station operated from the facilities of WCHK (with personalities Michael Searcy and Scott Evans).

The end
In the early 2000s, WCHK abandoned its country/gospel format in favor of news/talk. Shows included Ludlow Porch, Dave Ramsey, and local-based Paul Carden. The station also aired a simulcast of the 6PM news from WSB-TV. On July 18, 2004, Chuck McClure, owner of WCHK, died of natural causes.

On November 14, 2006, Davis Broadcasting, owners of WLKQ-FM 102.3 in Buford, made the purchase of both WCHK and sister station WNSY-FM, being completed in January 2007. Afterwards, both stations went off the air on January 22, 2007. WNSY returned to the airwaves on February 1, 2007 as a simulcast of WLKQ-FM (La Raza 102.3), broadcasting a Regional Mexican format. WCHK came back a year later, simulcasting WLKQ.

Spanish-language radio
In 2013, WCHK switched from Mexican music to a simulcast of W243CE Winder, airing a Spanish Tropical format as La Mega 96.5. W243CE was also heard on WSRV-HD3. In 2015, W243CE and WSRV-HD3 broke from the simulcast, with WCHK maintaining the Tropical format.

On March 21, 2017, WCHK re-added W243CE as a simulcast and relaunched the Latin pop format as La Nueva Mega 96.5/1290. The relaunch is intended to serve the Hispanic communities of North Fulton and Gwinnett Counties.

FM translators

Former personalities
Chuck McClure (owner)
Jim Axel (1957-1959, later moved to WAGA-TV)
Bob Peterson (1957-1962, Co-Owner)
Byron Dobbs (1957-1997, General Manager/presenter)
Steve Bramham (1963-1965, Announcer, Chief Engineer)
Jackson Bain (1962-1964) later  moved to WAGA-TV, then to NBC News
Chris Morgan (1990)
Mike McDougal
Joe Robinnell
Dick Byrd
Robert Owens
Linda Lee
Don Holt (1968-Feb 1972)
Scott Woodside
Jim McGhee
Paul Carden
Yzzi Evangelista ‘El Malo’(2017–19)
Tim (Lawson) Cavender (1974-1987, announcer and Operations Manager of WCHK AM)

See also
WBZY
WLKQ-FM
WNSY

References

External links
La Mega Website

CHK
Cherokee County, Georgia
Radio stations established in 1957
CHK